Rockwave Festival is a rock festival that takes place  in Malakasa, Greece, near Athens. It is one of the most famous music festivals in Greece. The festival's history begins in 1996, but its popularity has spread since 2004. The festival's location was constantly being changed until 2004, when event park TerraVibe Park, located in Attica, became the permanent venue of the festival.

2022 lineup

2018 lineup

2017 lineup

2016 lineup

2015 lineup

2014 lineup

2013 lineup

2012 lineup

2011 lineup

2010 lineup

2009 lineup

2008 lineup
Monday 31 March was the day when Didi Music-Big Star Promotion Ltd (music concert organizer), announced the names of the artists that would perform at Rockwave Festival 2008. Along with the names they introduced the changes in the festival's whole structure. 
The festival is now divided in two stages, "Terra" stage and "Vibe" stage (that comes by the name of the event park "TerraVibe"). They also abolished the division of the "Terra" concert area into gates PL1 and PL2, lowered the high price of the tickets and retained the special area that is on the side of the field, where there is more comfort, as there are places to sit.

2007 lineup
When the band names were first announced, Stone Sour were included in the third day of the festival. Although the band cancelled a few of their dates in their European tour, My Dying Bride filled up their spot in the third day.

2006 lineup
W.A.S.P. were to play on the third day but did not perform due to health issues of Blackie Lawless.

2005 lineup

2004 lineup
Running Wild did not perform and were replaced by Gamma Ray. Muse were also to perform on the fourth day of the festival but cancelled and were replaced by Mogwai.

2001 lineup
The festival took place in the Athens Olympic Velodrome (Athens Olympic Sports Complex) from 1 to 3 July.
The second day of the festival was cancelled by the Greek authorities, due to reasons of safety.

2000 lineup
The festival took place in Tritsis Park in Ilion, Athens.
Iron Maiden cancelled their show at the third day, due to Janick Gers' accident at a previous show. The Flaming Lips also cancelled their show on the first day.

1999 lineup
The festival took place in Agios Kosmas, Athens.

1998 lineup
The festival took place in Freattyda, Piraeus.

1997 lineup
The festival took place in Rizoupoli Stadium, now called Georgios Kamaras Stadium.

1996 lineup
The first festival was called "Rock of Gods" and took place in the Dock 3 of the Piraeus harbour. 
Motörhead was included in the first day of the festival, but cancelled and Saxon filled up their spot. Foo Fighters were to play on the third day of the festival, but Dave Grohl broke his arm at a previous show and Violent Femmes took their place.

External links
Rockwave Festival official Website (in Greek)
Terra Vibe the festival hosting area
Didi Music-Big Star Promotion Official Website (in Greek)

Rock festivals in Greece
Heavy metal festivals
Music festivals in Greece
Music festivals established in 1996
Tourist attractions in Attica
Events in Attica
Electronic music festivals in Greece
1996 establishments in Greece
Summer events in Greece